Donald  R. Huffman (born 1935) is a Professor Emeritus of Physics at the University of Arizona. With Wolfgang Krätschmer, he developed a technique in 1990 for the simple production of large quantities of C60, or Buckminsterfullerene. Previously, in 1982~1983, he and Krätschmer had found, in a UV spectrum, the first signal of C60 ever observed.

Huffman was featured prominently in the PBS Nova documentary, originally aired in 1995, "Race to Catch a Buckyball".

Bibliography
 Bohren, Craig F. and Donald R. Huffman, Absorption and scattering of light by small particles, New York : Wiley, 1998, 530 p.,

Awards
Hewlett Packard Europhysics Prize, 1994 (with Wolfgang Kraetschmer, Harold Kroto and Richard Smalley)
Materials Research Society, Gold Medal 1993, For Synthesis and Pioneering Study of Fullerenes

Notes

Living people
1935 births
21st-century American physicists
Carbon scientists